Talas Airport (Kyrgyz: Талас аэропорту, Russian: Таласский аэропорт)  is an airport serving Talas, the capital of Talas Province (oblast) of Kyrgyzstan. The Russian code for Talas Airport is ТЛС.

Talas Airport started its operations in 1940s as a landing strip outside the then small provincial town. The current runway and terminal were built in 1979. It is a regional class 3C airport. The runway has a weight limit of 22 tonnes, and has no instrument landing facilities and operates only during daylight hours.

Talas Airport has no customs and border control checks and serves only flights within Kyrgyzstan. Until 1997, Talas had year-round regular links with Bishkek, Osh and Jalal-Abad.

Accidents 
On June 28, 1969, an Aeroflot Ilyushin Il-14 (CCCP-91495) flight to Frunze took off from Talas Airport at 19:36 with 35 passengers and five crew members aboard. After take-off, the crew executed a right turn towards the mountains instead of the procedure left turn. Ilyushin Il-14 collided with a mountain at an altitude of 3150 m (1884 m above the runway elevation) at 8.7 km to the left of the runway. At 19:50, the plane struck a mountain, 39 km from Talas Airport, and was completely destroyed. All passengers and crew were killed. At the time, it was the worst accident in Kyrgyz aviation and remains the second worst. It was also the worst accident at the time involving Ilyushin Il-14.

References 

 http://www.ourairports.com/airports/KG-0004/pilot-info.html
 http://www.civilaviation.kg/index.php?option=com_content&view=article&id=53&Itemid=82

External links 
 http://www.ourairports.com/airports/KG-0004/pilot-info.html

Airports in Kyrgyzstan
Airports built in the Soviet Union